Felisberto Caldeira Brant Pontes de Oliveira Horta, the Marquis of Barbacena (19 September 1772 – 13 June 1842) was a Brazilian soldier and statesman of both Portugal and the Empire of Brazil.

Life 

Brant was born in Mariana, then the Portuguese Colony of Brazil, in 1772. He attended the Royal College of Nobles in Lisbon, eventually becoming an officer in the Portuguese army. Early in his career, Brant was sent to Angola, where he served as aide de camp to the royal governor there. In 1807, during the French invasion of Portugal, the Prince Regent, Dom João VI, fled to Brazil with a large retinue.  Brant, who had by then returned to Portugal, accompanied the Prince Regent to South America.  There, he became a pioneer in the field of steam transportation, developing such an interest in the method that he was granted official authorization to study it.

By 1821, the Prince Regent had returned to Portugal, leaving his son Dom Pedro I in control of Brazil.  Relations between the two regions grew tense, and Brazil broke away from the kingdom.  Brant supported Dom Pedro, now the Emperor, being sent on a diplomatic mission to London by José Bonifácio, the minister for both internal and foreign affairs. He met little success during his stay in England, and he returned to Brazil by 1826. During the Cisplatine War (1825-1828) with Argentina, Brant rose to become commander-in-chief of Brazilian forces.  He commanded the Brazilian army during a failed invasion of Argentina, and was fought to a draw in the Battle of Ituzaingó.  In 1829, Brant was charged with finding a bride for Dom Pedro.  He succeeded in this mission, but fell from grace shortly afterward.  He died in 1842.

References

Bibliography

External links 
 Senado Federal. Vida do Marquez de Barbacena

Finance Ministers of Brazil
Brazilian generals
Brazilian nobility
1772 births
1842 deaths
People of the Cisplatine War